The 2012 Guangzhou International Women's Open was a women's tennis tournament played on outdoor hard courts. It was the 9th edition of the Guangzhou International Women's Open, and part of the WTA International tournaments of the 2012 WTA Tour. It took place in Guangzhou, China, from September 17 through September 23, 2012.

Champions

Singles

 Hsieh Su-wei defeated  Laura Robson, 6–3, 5–7, 6–4
It was the second title of the year and the second of her career for Hsieh. It was the first tour level final of her career for Robson.

Doubles

 Tamarine Tanasugarn /  Zhang Shuai defeated  Jarmila Gajdošová /  Monica Niculescu,  2–6, 6–2, [10–8]

Singles main-draw entrants

Seeds 

 1 Seeds are based on the rankings of September 10, 2012

Other entrants
The following players received wildcards into the singles main draw:
  Duan Yingying
  Wang Qiang
  Zheng Saisai

The following players received entry from the qualifying draw:
  Zarina Diyas
  Luksika Kumkhum
  Nudnida Luangnam
  Hu Yueyue

The following player received entry as lucky loser:
  Kai-Chen Chang

Withdrawals
  Petra Cetkovská

Retirements
  Marion Bartoli (gastrointestinal illness)
  Olga Govortsova
  Alexandra Panova
  María-Teresa Torró-Flor
  Chan Yung-jan (dizziness)

Doubles main-draw entrants

Seeds

1 Rankings are as of September 10, 2012

Other entrants
The following pairs received wildcards into the doubles main draw:
  Liang Chen /  Tian Ran
  Yan Zi /  Zhang Ling

Retirements
  Chan Yung-jan (dizziness)
  Pauline Parmentier (gastrointestinal illness)

External links 

Guangzhou International Women's Open
2012
2012 in Chinese tennis